The Kuwaiti Futsal super cup started in 2010 after the first season of futsal football finished.

Champions

 2010: Al-Yarmouk SC
 2011: Al-Yarmouk SC
 2012: Qadsia SC
 2013: Qadsia SC
 2014: Al-Yarmouk SC
 2015: Kazma SC
 2016: Qadsia SC 7-3 Kazma SC
 2017: Kazma SC 5-3 Kuwait SC
 2018: Kazma SC 4-3 Kuwait SC
 2019: Kuwait SC 2-1 Qadsia SC
 2020: No edition 
 2021:

References

Futsal
Super
2010 establishments in Kuwait